Žirovnica is a small settlement in the hills north of Loka pri Zidanem Mostu in the Municipality of Sevnica in east-central Slovenia. The area is part of the historical region of Styria and is now included in the Lower Sava Statistical Region with the rest of the municipality.

References

External links
Žirovnica at Geopedia

Populated places in the Municipality of Sevnica